A pedigree chart is a diagram that shows the occurrence and appearance of phenotypes of a particular gene or organism and its ancestors from one generation to the next, most commonly humans, show dogs, and race horses.

Definition
The word pedigree is a corruption of the Anglo-Norman French pé de grue or "crane's foot", either because the typical lines and split lines (each split leading to different offspring of the one parent line) resemble the thin leg and foot of a crane or because such a mark was used to denote succession in pedigree charts.

A pedigree results in the presentation of family information in the form of an easily readable chart. It can be simply called as a "family tree". Pedigrees use a standardized set of symbols, squares represent males and circles represent females. Pedigree construction is a family history, and details about an earlier generation may be uncertain as memories fade. If the sex of the person is unknown a diamond is used. Someone with the phenotype in question is represented by a filled-in (darker) symbol. Heterozygotes, when identifiable, are indicated by a shade dot inside a symbol or a half-filled symbol.

Relationships in a pedigree are shown as a series of lines. Parents are connected by a horizontal line and a vertical line leads to their offspring. The offspring are connected by a horizontal sibship line and listed in birth order from left to right. If the offspring are twins then they will be connected by a triangle. If an offspring dies then its symbol will be crossed by a line. If the offspring is still born or aborted it is represented by a small triangle.

Each generation is identified by a Roman numeral (I, II, III, and so on), and each individual within the same generation is identified by an Arabic numeral (1, 2, 3, and so on). Analysis of the pedigree using the principles of Mendelian inheritance can determine whether a trait has a dominant or recessive pattern of inheritance. Pedigrees are often constructed after a family member afflicted with a genetic disorder has been identified. This individual, known as the proband, is indicated on the pedigree by an arrow. These changes may occur yearly or monthly.

In human use
In England and Wales pedigrees are officially recorded in the College of Arms, which has records going back to the Middle Ages, including pedigrees collected during roving inquiries by its heralds during the sixteenth and seventeenth centuries. The purpose of these heraldic visitations was to register and regulate the use of coats of arms. Those who claimed the right to bear arms had to provide proof either of a grant of arms to them by the College, or of descent from an ancestor entitled to arms. It was for this reason that pedigrees were recorded by the visitations. Pedigrees continue to be registered at the College of Arms and kept up to date on a voluntary basis but they are not accessible to the general public without payment of a fee.

More visible, therefore, are the pedigrees recorded in published works, such as Burke's Peerage and Burke's Landed Gentry in the United Kingdom and, in continental Europe by the Almanach de Gotha.

A pedigree may be used to establish the probability of a child having a particular disorder or condition. It may be used to discover where the genes in question are located (x, y, or autosome chromosome), and to determine whether a trait is dominant or recessive. When a pedigree shows a condition appearing in a 50:50 ratio between men and women it is considered autosomal. When the condition predominantly affects males in the pedigree it is considered x-linked.

Some examples of dominant traits include: male baldness, astigmatism, and dwarfism. Some examples of recessive traits include: small eyes, little body hair, and tall stature.

In animal husbandry

In the practice of selective breeding of animals, particularly in animal fancy and livestock, including horses, pedigree charts are used to track the ancestry of animals and assist in the planning of suitable breeding programs to enhance desirable traits. Breed registries are formed and are dedicated to the accurate tracking of pedigrees and maintaining accurate records of birth, death and identifying characteristics of each registered animal.

See also

 Ahnentafel
 Cousin chart
 Family tree
 Genealogical numbering systems
 Genogram
 Foundation bloodstock
 Certificate of Degree of Indian Blood

References

Classical genetics
Diagrams
Family trees